is a Japanese professional footballer who currently play for J3 League club, FC Ryukyu. He scored the two goals that gave his team the title of the 2016 J1 League over Urawa Red Diamonds.

Club career
On 25 March 2020, Kanazaki returned to Nagoya Grampus on loan from Sagan Tosu until 31 January 2021. On 15 January 2021, following his season on loan at Nagoya Grampus, Kanazaki signed permanently for the club.

On 24 February 2023, Kanazaki announcement officially transfer to J3 relegated club, FC Ryukyu for ahead of 2023 season.

International career
Kanazaki made his full international debut for Japan on 20 January 2009 in a 2011 AFC Asian Cup qualification against Yemen.

Career statistics

Club
.

International

 
Scores and results list Japan's goal tally first, score column indicates score after each Kanazaki goal.

Honours
Oita Trinita
J.League Cup: 2008

Nagoya Grampus
J1 League: 2010
Japanese Super Cup: 2011
J.League Cup: 2021

Kashima Antlers
J.League Cup: 2015
J1 League: 2016
Emperor's Cup: 2016
Japanese Super Cup: 2017

Individual
J. League Cup New Hero Award: 2008

References

 Portimonense anuncia regresso de Mu Kanazaki, desporto.sapo.pt, 25 December 2015

External links

Profile at Kashima Antlers

Living people
1989 births
Association football people from Mie Prefecture
Japanese footballers
Association football midfielders
Japan international footballers
J1 League players
J2 League players
J3 League players
Bundesliga players
Liga Portugal 2 players
Oita Trinita players
Nagoya Grampus players
1. FC Nürnberg players
Portimonense S.C. players
Kashima Antlers players
Sagan Tosu players
FC Ryukyu players
Japanese expatriate footballers
Japanese expatriate sportspeople in Portugal
Japanese expatriate sportspeople in Germany
Expatriate footballers in Germany
Expatriate footballers in Portugal